The basketball tournaments of National Collegiate Athletic Association (Philippines) 83rd season hosted by Jose Rizal University began on June 23, 2007 at the Araneta Coliseum with Samahang Basketbol ng Pilipinas president Manuel V. Pangilinan as the keynote speaker. All subsequent elimination round games will be held at The Arena in San Juan (except for the penultimate playdate, which was held at the Araneta). The theme of the season is "Soaring High at 83" while the Studio 23 coverage uses the theme "Brotherhood of the ball" .

Seniors' tournament

Teams

Preseason
San Beda Red Lions replaced their head coach; Purefoods assistant coach Koy Banal was replaced by Talk 'N Text team manager Frankie Lim, while the Mapua Cardinals hired former Cardinal Leo Isaac to replace Horacio Lim (no relation to the Talk 'N Text team manager). San Sebastian, meanwhile, hired Philippine Basketball League champion coach Jorge Gallent of the Harbour Centre Batang Pier.

With the suspension of the PCU Dolphins, only seven teams competed in the tournament.

The tournament began on June 23 with a triple-header at the Araneta Coliseum with hosts JRU facing defending champions San Beda while Intramuros rivals Letran and Mapua faced off in the last televised game. The remaining elimination round games are set to be held at The Arena in San Juan.

Elimination round
The opening day was held at the Araneta Coliseum with Samahang Basketbol ng Pilipinas president Manuel V. Pangilinan as the keynote speaker. All subsequent first-round games will be held at The Arena in San Juan.

Team standings

Match-up results

Scores

Results on top and to the right of the dashes are for first-round games; those to the bottom and to the left of it are second-round games.

Postseason teams

San Beda Red Lions
San Beda attempted to sweep the first round and dominated the opposition; on the final game of the first round, the Red Lions faced the second place Letran Knights. SBC led for much of the game, but the Knights came back, capped with 6 points in the last minutes by Letran's Rey Guevarra, who converted an undergoal stab to put Letran up for good, after San Beda's Pong Escobal converted a disputed two-point shot.

The Red Lions rebounded after their loss and had a 5-game winning streak leading up to their second-round rematch with Letran. They won a notable game over JRU that embroiled San Beda in a legal tussle with the league (see Aljamal suspension, below). JRU committed 3 unsportsmanlike fouls as SBC head coach Frankie Lim and JRU mentor Ariel Vanguardia had a shouting match in the Arena's corridors after the game. San Beda avenged their first round loss against Letran with a win in which they led for the whole second half.

Letran Knights
After a 4-0 start, the Knights were dealt their first loss by season's host JRU, but after rallying from 20 points down came up short. Their win over San Beda ensured a #1 finish for the Knights, but their Intramuros rivals Mapua denied them another 4-0 streak as MVP candidate Kelvin dela Peña bailed out the Cardinals with an almost triple-double performance. Letran won their next game against San Sebastian to set up their rematch.

Trailing most of the game, Letran cut the deficit to two but a Borgie Hermida three-pointer kept the Knights from victory as they were beaten by San Beda 87-84 at the sold-out Araneta Coliseum. After the game, Letran players and San Beda supporters engaged in a brawl. The coaches and players received trivial punishments. Letran beat JRU in a frantic finish to seize the #2 seed.

JRU Heavy Bombers
JRU suffered an opening game loss against San Beda but rebounded in the next game to beat San Sebastian. However, they were beaten two more times, one via overtime against UPHD to fall with a 1-3 card. JRU seized the advantage on their game against Letran and held on to win.

JRU then made 5 consecutive wins, assuring themselves of the last semi-final berth. San Beda then broke the winning streak in a fight-marred game in which 3 JRU players were assessed with unsportsmanlike fouls. On their next game against SSC-R (which needed to win to stay in contention), the Bombers rallied with a 7-0 run in the last 2 minutes to force overtime and an eventual win. With the Bombers losing to the Knights in their rescheduled game, JRU now had to beat Letran consecutively to enter the Finals.

Mapúa Cardinals
Mapúa started on the wrong foot with a 0-3 start with losses against rivals Letran, against CSB (their only win in the season) and San Beda without last year's suspended MVP, Sam Ekwe. Mapúa then  won against JRU and Perpetual in overtime to finish the first round against 2-4.

Mapúa lost a further two games against San Beda and JRU, but defeated Letran. Anchored by two-time player of the week Kelvin dela Peña, Mapúa won the next 4 games in order to finish with 6-6. Typhoons suspended some of the games, allowing the Cardinals to finish a week early. San Sebastian's losses enabled Mapúa to clinch the #4 berth a semis rematch against San Beda, which had eliminated them in the 2006 semifinals.

Bracket

Semifinals
Letran and San Beda have the twice-to-beat advantage. They only have to win once, while their opponents, twice, to progress.

Letran vs. JRU

With fans wearing "We believe" shirts, the Heavy Bombers expected a battle of attrition against the Knights. Letran was able to make outside jumpers, with Bryan Faundo scoring the bulk of the points in the first three quarters; JRU meanwhile relied on the offensive rebounds of Marvin Hayes and James Sena to keep in pace with the Knights. In the fourth quarter Letran relied on RJ Jazul who scored 8 of his game-high 17 points to break the game open.

San Beda vs. Mapua

Mapua raced to an 11-6 lead, but after a Frankie Lim time out, San Beda cut the lead and eventually pulled away in the third quarter. MVP candidate Yousif Aljamal carried the team with several clutch three-pointers to keep the Cardinals at bay. Kelvin dela Peña's outside sniping cut the San Beda lead to 8 from a high of 14 before Aljamal converted another three-pointer. After not scoring, the Cardinals forced a turnover, but dela Peña was not able to convert a contested fastbreak lay-up to dash Mapua's hopes of a championship.

Finals

Finals Most Valuable Player: 

In Game 1, San Beda and Letran started the game by trading baskets, then Letran broke away after their time out to lead by seven at the end of the first period. San Beda answered with their own 10-0 run to lead by a point. The two teams battled evenly in a low-scoring third quarter. However, San Beda had a deciding run when RJ Jazul sat down after a hard foul at the beginning of the fourth quarter. Jazul came back cold and the Knights weren't able to come close as San Beda took game 1.

San Beda raced into an early lead in Game 2 where Letran had a tough time recovering; the nearest they came was five points late in the third quarter. San Beda held off Letran due to their fast break plays, thanks to rebounds of Nigerian behemoth Sam Ekwe.

Ogie Menor was named Finals Most Valuable Player.

Suspensions
Samuel Ekwe of the San Beda Red Lions after kicking Lee Sang Myeon of UPHD Altas. Served one-game suspension at their July 4 game against the Mapua Cardinals. This suspension disqualified Ekwe for MVP contention.
Coach Jorge Gallent of the San Sebastian Stags after being ejected for two technical fouls on a game against the Letran Knights. Served one-game suspension at their July 13 game against the Mapua Cardinals; Staglets coach Raymond Valenzona coached in place of him.
St. Benilde Blazers shooting guard Paolo Orbeta has been arrested by the National Bureau of Investigation for alleged game-fixing in NCAA games. This has been the first arrest in game-fixing since the investigation last season. Orbera has been suspended by CSB and the NCAA indefinitely starting from their second-round game against the JRU Heavy Bombers as further investigation continues.

Aljamal suspension
After Yousif Aljamal of the San Beda Red Lions was drafted at the 2007 Philippine Basketball Association (PBA) Draft, he was suspended by the NCAA Management Committee (MANCOMM) for the rest of the season after not informing the MANCOMM that he was joining the draft (5 other players from the previous two seasons were able to play after they were drafted). San Beda appealed the decision, and Aljamal should have served his suspension from their August 22 game against the JRU Heavy Bombers. San Beda was able to secure a 72-hour temporary restraining order (TRO) that allowed Aljamal to play in the San Beda-JRU game, while the NCAA Policy Board reduced to suspension to three games. With San Beda bringing the issue to the courts, a ranking member of suggested to The Daily Tribune that the Management Committee was considering suspending the basketball season.

With this development, ABS-CBN, the  tournament's sole broadcaster, threatened to sue the league if the season was scrapped, citing massive advertising losses for the lost coverage; meanwhile JRU officials denied that cancellation of the season was suggested. San Beda meanwhile threatened to bolt out of the league (again) "if no solution is found to diffuse the ongoing case involving Aljamal." The Manila Regional Trial Court (RTC) then granted a 20-day extension to the order after a lengthy hearing. It was also revealed that JRU President Vicente K. Fabella and top San Beda officials  were to meet on Sunday (August 26).

The PBA stated that Aljamal "has never played in a single tournament organized by the PBA and should not be considered a professional basketball player as of now." The NCAA meanwhile asked the Manila RTC to lift the TRO. ABS-CBN executives mediated the matter along with NCAA and San Beda officials. It was revealed that the PBA was the one tasked "to inform the various leagues of their players’ participation in the draft. But problems that beset the PBA have overtaken events and Aljamal was an unwilling victim. It was not his fault and he should not be sanctioned."

At a press conference held at the ABS-CBN Compound in Quezon City, San Beda withdrew their case against the NCAA and made Aljamal "sit out" the remaining elimination games against UPHD and Letran. SBC also apologized to the NCAA for "all the difficulties and bad publicity". The NCAA for its part disregarded the suspensions, placing Aljamal back in the race for individual awards.

Awards
 
Most Valuable Player:  
Mythical Five:
 

 
 
Rookie of the Year:  
Most Improved Player: 
Defensive Player of the Year:  
Players of the week - The NCAA Press Corps awards an outstanding player every week:
 Rogemar Menor (June 25-July 1)
 RJ Jazul (July 2–8)
 Yousif Aljamal (July 9–15)
 Rey Guevarra (July 16–29)
 Kelvin dela Peña (July 30-August 5)
 Kelvin dela Peña (August 6–12)
 Jim Viray (August 13–19)
 Bryan Faundo (August 20–26)
 Rogemar Menor (August 27-Sept. 2)

Statistical leaders
Points: Yousif Aljamal (San Beda, 17.1)
Rebounds: Samuel Ekwe (San Beda, 16.1)
Assists: Kelvin dela Peña (Mapua, 5.6)
Blocks: Samuel Ekwe (San Beda, 3.5)
Steals: Kelvin dela Peña (Mapua, 2.1)
Turnovers: Mike Kong (UPHD, 4.7)

Juniors' tournament
The juniors' basketball tournament begins on June 25 at The Arena in San Juan with six schools participating. (Note: PCU Baby Dolphins and Mapua's Malayan Science are expected to join in Season 84.)

Elimination round

Bracket

Semifinals

San Sebastian vs. JRU
Elimination round games:
 July 16: JRU 96-109 San Sebastian at the Arena
 July 30: JRU 71-79 San Sebastian at the Arena

Letran vs. San Beda
Elimination round games:
 July 9: Letran 106-92 San Beda at the Arena
 August 31: Letran 98-96 San Beda at the Araneta Coliseum

Finals
Elimination round games:
 July 2: Letran 75-74 San Sebastian at the Arena
 August 24: Letran 70-64 San Sebastian at the Arena

Finals Most Valuable Player:

Awards
Most Valuable Player: 
Rookie of the Year: 
Mythical Five:

Most Improved Player: 
Defensive Player of the Year:

Broadcast notes
ABS-CBN's UHF channel Studio 23 was the sole broadcaster of the games, covering all men's games (except for the UPHD-San Sebastian game on opening day), the Letran-San Beda juniors second-round game, and the Finals series of the juniors. 101.9 For Life!, ABS-CBN's FM radio station, delivered updates on game dates.

NCAA College Hoops airs every Monday afternoons as a supplement for the main NCAA coverage. It is hosted by Andrei Felix and San Beda courtside reporter Pia Boren.

Playoffs broadcasters:

Champion rosters

San Beda Red Lions

San Sebastian Staglets

See also
UAAP Season 70 basketball tournaments

References

External links
NCAA official website

83
2007–08 in Philippine basketball